Geoffrey Brooke (1920–2009) was a British modern pentathlete.

Geoffrey Brook(e) may also refer to:

Geoffrey Brooke (equestrian) (1884–1966), British equestrian
Geoffrey Brooke, character in 12.10 (film)
Geoffrey Brook, musician in The Brook Brothers

See also
Geoffrey Brooke-Taylor (1895–1968), English cricketer